Acrobasis rufilimbalis is a species of snout moth in the genus Acrobasis. It was described by Wileman in 1911. It is found in Japan.

The wingspan is 15–18 mm.

References

Moths described in 1911
Acrobasis
Moths of Japan